Sir Bryan Edwards was Chief Justice of Jamaica in 1855.

References 

Chief justices of Jamaica
Year of birth missing
Knights Bachelor
Year of death missing
19th-century Jamaican judges